Ira Sharkansky (born 1938, Fall River, Massachusetts) is professor emeritus of political science and public administration at Hebrew University of Jerusalem. He is a prolific author on policy and politics in Israel and the United States. He regularly blogs for The Jerusalem Post and San Diego Jewish World.

Academic career
Sharkansky graduated from Wesleyan University, writing his thesis on "The Portuguese of Fall River: A Study of Ethnic Acculturation". He earned his PhD in political science at the University of Wisconsin–Madison in 1964. His dissertation was published as "Four Agencies and an Appropriations Subcommittee: A comparative study of budget relations". His first academic post was as assistant professor at Ball State University that same year; he subsequently held assistant professorships at Florida State University (1965–1966) and University of Georgia (1966–1968). From 1968 to 1971 he was an associate professor at the University of Wisconsin, where he advanced to full professor from 1971 to 1975. In 1975 he moved to the Hebrew University of Jerusalem, where he was a full professor in the political science and public administration departments until 2005 and professor emeritus thereafter.

In 1979 he became  a fellow of the National Academy of Public Administration.

Personal
Sharkansky resides in the French Hill neighborhood of Jerusalem. He is married to Varda, and his children are Stefan, Erica, Tamar, and Mattan. Stefan maintains a blog called the Shark Blog, to which Professor Sharkansky contributes.

Selected bibliography
 (with Gedalia Auerbach)

 (2nd edition)

 (with Robert L. Lineberry)

References

Academic staff of the Hebrew University of Jerusalem
Israeli political scientists
People from Fall River, Massachusetts
Living people
1938 births
Wesleyan University alumni
 University of Wisconsin–Madison College of Letters and Science alumni